General elections were held in Singapore on 2 April 1955 to elect members to the 25 elected seats in the Legislative Assembly. Nomination day was on 28 February 1955.

Background
Following the promulgation of the Rendel Constitution, the 1955 elections were the first occasion on which a majority of the seats were to be elected rather than be appointed by the colonial authorities. The new constitution was written after recommendations by a committee to grant local citizens more autonomy, headed by George Rendel, were passed.

According to the new Constitution, locals would share executive power with the colonial authorities and there would be a Chief Minister among elected legislators. The number of elected seats was increased to 25, with the British government appointing the remaining seven members. For the first time, political parties were permitted to adopt a standard party symbol for all their candidates and independents to select theirs instead of balloting for them.

The Governor of Singapore and Colonial Secretary posts were replaced by a Chief Secretary, who inherited the power to appoint four nominated Assembly Members. Also scrapped were the seats of the Solicitor-General, two directors, two ex officios, the three commercial organisations and the City Council representative.

Timeline

Changes in electoral boundaries

Results

Much to the surprise for British, who had anticipated a Progressive victory and its leader, Tan Chye Cheng, to emerge as Chief Minister, it was the Labour Front that garnered the most seats and its chairman, David Marshall, thus became Singapore's first Chief Minister. Both losing and winning parties were shocked by the results. Labour Front formed a government with support of the Malayan Chinese Association (MCA), UMNO and the Malay Union.

In its first elections, the newly formed People's Action Party, led by lawyer and former Progressive Party election agent Lee Kuan Yew, chose to field only a handful of candidates to protest against the Rendel Constitution. As independent member Ahmad Ibrahim joined PAP following the election, PAP had 4 members in the Assembly and thus Lee became the new Leader of the Opposition.

The election saw the electorate multiply 6 folds. Voter turnout barely increased by 0.61% to 52.66%. 6 of the 25 constituencies saw voter turnout less than 50%. The lowest was that of Geylang which saw only 40.84% turning up to vote. This surpassed the City Constituency's 43.93% turnout in 1951 and with compulsory voting introduced in the next 1959 General Election, this was the lowest turnout in a constituency in the non-compulsory voting period (1948-1959). The constituency with the highest voter turnout was that of Southern Islands at 69.79%. The election's best performing candidate was Labour Front candidate and Future Chief Minister Lim Yew Hock who polled 86.48% of the votes. The worst performing candidate was Independent candidate Chua Kim Watt who polled just 0.55% of the votes in Farrer Park. Labour Front leader and Chief Ministerial candidate David Saul Marshall won his Cairnhill constituency with 47.58% of the votes. Future Prime Minister of Singapore and PAP leader Lee Kuan Yew won his Tanjong Pagar constituency with 78.33% over his two rival candidates making it the second best performance after Lim Yew Hock. Ironically, PP leader Tan Chye Cheng was defeated in Cairnhill by David Marshall and polled just 36.42%. 10 candidates lost their $500 election deposits.

Future Chief Minister of Singapore Lim Yew Hock won with the biggest margin of 78.58% while Malay Union candidate Mohamed Sidik bin Abdul Hamid won with the narrowest margin of just 1.15%.

Out of the 7 non-elected seats, 3 were ex-officio members namely: Sir William Goode (the Chief Secretary of Singapore), Sir John Edward Davies (the Attorney-General of Singapore) and Thomas Mure Hart, the Finance Secretary of Singapore.

4 members were nominated out of which 2 were from the Labour Front and 2 Independents. This gave the LF 12 seats. The Labour Front formed a Coalition Government with UMNO and MCA each having 1 seat. The LF-UMNO-MCA Coalition had 14 seats and with British support (3 ex-officio members) had 17 seats just enough for a majority in the 32-seat Assembly. On  6 April 1955, David Marshall was sworn in as the First Chief Minister of Singapore making him also the First Head of Government in the country.

As of 2021, this election remains the only election to have produced a minority government and a hung legislature. It also remains the only election to have produced a Non-PAP Government in the history of Singapore.

By constituency

See also 
List of Singaporean electoral divisions (1955–59)

References

Sr, Pugalenthi (1996) Elections in Singapore VJ Times International Pte Ltd, Singapore

External links
General Elections 1955 Singapore Elections
Results of 1955 election in Singapore

General elections in Singapore
British rule in Singapore
Singapore
1955 in Singapore